The Hits is the first compilation album by English singer Lemar. It was released on 8 March 2010 through Epic Records. The album contains three new songs plus a re-recorded version of "What About Love" with X Factor 2008 runner's up JLS. One new recording entitled "You Don't Love Me" features a sample from Kim Wildes 1986 remake of the 60's motown classic "You Keep Me Hanging On" by The Supremes.

The album does not contain two of Lemar's Epic singles, "Don't Give It Up" and "Tick Tock", both of which were remixed from their respective album versions when they were released as singles. These single versions do not appear on any of Lemar's albums. The album also misses out his rare debut single "Got Me Saying Ooh".

Promotion
The first single off the album was "The Way Love Goes." A second single taken from The Hits, "Coming Home," was released on 17 May 2010.

Critical reception

AllMusic editor Jon O'Brien noted that "losing out to David Sneddon might not have been the most auspicious start, but despite its occasional lapses into derivativeness, Hits is a solid body of work that ultimately proves it's not the winning that counts." Alex Fletcher from Digital Spy found that Lemar's "quality control may fall short over the course of these 15 tracks, but this isn't to say that there aren't some notable high points here. Lemar's greatest trick is penning and performing tracks which sound like covers of forgotten '70s R&B gems."

Track listing

Notes
 denotes a co-producer

Charts

Certifications

Release history

References

External links
 Lemar interview talking about Greatest Hits album
 Lemar interview by Pete Lewis, 'Blues & Soul' March 2010
 

2010 greatest hits albums
Lemar albums
Albums produced by Richard Stannard (songwriter)